11th London Film Critics Circle Awards
1991

Film of the Year: 
 Crimes and Misdemeanors 

The 11th London Film Critics Circle Awards, honouring the best in film for 1990, were announced by the London Film Critics Circle in 1991.

Winners
Film of the Year
Crimes and Misdemeanors

Foreign Language Film of the Year
Cinema Paradiso • Italy

Director of the Year
Woody Allen – Crimes and Misdemeanors

Screenwriter of the Year
Woody Allen – Crimes and Misdemeanors

Actor of the Year
Philippe Noiret – Cinema Paradiso

Special Achievement Award
Penelope Houston
Simon Relph

References

External links
IMDB
Official Website

1
1990 film awards
1990 in London
1990 in British cinema
1990 awards in the United Kingdom